Kazım Ersun Yanal (born 17 December 1961) is a Turkish football coach who is the manager of Süper Lig club Alanyaspor. His style has always been attacking football doubled up with tactics unprecedented in Turkish Football, featuring a new scientific understanding of the game. He enjoys a very respectable place amongst Turkish coaches having only won a single title.

Managerial career

2000–2013
Under Yanal's managership, Ankaragücü has seen two successive seasons, becoming 6th in the 2000–01 season and 4th in the 2001–02 season. He reached the 4th round of the UEFA cup with Gençlerbirliği and was knocked out by eventual champions Valencia 2–1 on aggregate after extra-time in the second leg. He also twice lost the final of the Turkish Cup to Trabzonspor in 2003 and 2004. In April 2004 he was appointed as head coach of the Turkish National Team. Yanal's tactics showed their fruit immediately as Turkey won the Friendships Cup after beating Australia 3–1 and 1–0. Yanal's successful run was ended by South-Korea after a 2–1 defeat. His job was to secure qualification for the 2006 World Cup but despite being on target to achieving this goal, sitting in second place in the qualifying group, he was dismissed in June 2005 to be replaced by Fatih Terim, who couldn't lead the team to the finals in Germany. Yanal was named new manager of Manisaspor for the 2005–06 season. At the end of the winter break in the 2006–07 season, the club were flying high in fourth position. However, they could not keep up the results, finishing in 12th place, four points away from relegation. Yanal parted company with Manisaspor after their match at home to bottom-side Sakaryaspor was abandoned following on field violence. In October 2007 he was signed by Trabzonspor to take over from Ziya Doğan, signing a three-year deal at the club. In April 2009 he resigned his job from Trabzonspor. He has been the General Director of the Turkish Football Federation, since March 2010. On 4 October he was resigned from this job.

2013–
On 28 June 2013, Yanal has agreed to take charge of Fenerbahçe, replacing Aykut Kocaman who resigned at the end of May, the club said on Friday. His appointment coincides with tough times for the Fenerbahçe who have been banned from European competition for two seasons over their alleged involvement in a domestic match-fixing scandal. Fenerbahçe, who finished second in the Süper Lig last season, will miss out on next season's Champions League which they had been due to enter in the third qualifying round. On 1 July 2013, Fenerbahçe opened new season with training session. Yanal, addressing his players, said the absolute goal was winning the Süper Lig championship. “I have gotten to know you. You will get to know me and we will get to know each other much better. Let's keep our eyes on the prize and hope for the best next season,” he noted. On 18 July 2013, Yanal's team Fenerbahçe's will enter the Champions League third qualifying round on Friday despite its UEFA ban for match-fixing scandal after winning an emergency ruling from the Court of Arbitration for Sport. On 31 July 2013, The Yanal's first official match, his team Fenerbahçe made the most of their UEFA Champions League lifeline with a 1–1 draw against Red Bull Salzburg in the first leg of their third qualifying round tie on Wednesday. On 6 August 2013, Fenerbahçe defeated Red Bull Salzburg in UEFA Champions League Third qualifying round with a 3–1 win. Also this match was the first official win the game for the new manager Ersun Yanal. On 11 August 2013, Yanal's team Fenerbahçe and Galatasaray kicked off the new season of Turkish soccer in the Super Cup which was played in Kayseri. This was the 375th meeting between the two sides in history. Both sides played decent attacking soccer, but it was Galatasaray who had the last laugh with Didier Drogba heading home the only goal in the first half of extra time.

On 18 August 2013, Yanal's first league match with Fenerbahçe, paid the price for its distraction as they squandered a 2–0 first half lead to eventually lose 3–2 to newcomer Torku Konyaspor in their Süper Lig opener at Konya Atatürk Stadium on Saturday evening. On 18 August 2013, Yanal's team Fenerbahçe will have a mountain to climb to reach the group stages of the Champions League after being crushed 3–0 by an efficient Arsenal at their caldron of Şükrü Saracoğlu Stadium in the first leg of the play-off round.  First 6 matches in Super Lig, Fenerbahçe won 5 matches and scored 16 goals in this matches. On 10 November 2013, Yanal's team Fenerbahçe were the victors by 2–0 against Galatasaray, managing to maintain a nearly 15-year streak of suffering no derby losses on their home turf, the Şükrü Saracoğlu Stadium in Kadıköy. The last time Fenerbahçe suffered a loss at home in a derby was back in 1999. On 24 November 2013, Last-gasp road victories are turning into a habit for Fenerbahçe, as they have pulled tonight another of such wins against Antalyaspor thanks to a 90th-minute goal from Moussa Sow to stay on top of the Süper Lig. On 1 December 2013, Yanal's team Fenerbahçe and Besiktaş drew 3–3 in a fascinating Süper Lig match that witnessed a breathtaking game and a number of controversial positions. On 4 December 2013, Fenerbahçe suffered an unexpected 2–1 reverse in their Turkish Cup game at their home Şükrü Saracoğlu Stadium against first division minnows of Fethiyespor with the result, the double title-holders fall as they had entered the competition in the fourth round stage. On 27 April 2014, Yanal's team Fenerbahçe won the Süper Lig title with three games to spare on Sunday after a 0–0 draw at home to Çaykur Rizespor, in front of a crowd made up exclusively of women and children. On 21 May 2014, Yanal has extended his contract with Fenerbahce by two years Fenerbahçe. Yanal would earn $1,75 million each year in accordance with the contract. However, on 9 August 2014, he resigned from Fenerbahçe due to disagreements with the club's board.

Managerial statistics

Honours

Managerial honours
Denizlispor
 TFF First League runner-up (1): 1998–99

Gençlerbirliği
 Turkish Cup runner-up (2): 2002–03, 2003–04

Fenerbahçe
 Süper Lig (1): 2013–14

Management style
The 51-year-old Yanal coached Eskişehirspor this past season and led the Central Anatolian side to eighth place in the 18-team Süper Lig. He had previously coached Denizlispor, Ankaragücü, Gençlerbirliği, the Turkish national team, Manisaspor and Trabzonspor but achieved only scant success. In fact, he left or was forced to leave almost all these teams, except Eskişehirspor, before his contract expired. The reason was that Yanal usually adopted a self-destructive tactic of going all out on attack and leaving huge holes in the midfield and defense. That may be why matches involving a team under his tutelage were interesting to watch and also the reason why his team, more often than not, conceded almost as many goals as it scored. Yanal may have changed his tactics a little bit, but the result remained almost exactly the same. While managing Eskişehirspor, the team scored 48 goals but conceded 40.

Personal

He was born in İzmir, Turkey. He graduated from Manisa Celal Bayar University in 1984. He is married and has two kids. He is of Kosovo Albanian origin.

See also
 List of Fenerbahçe S.K. managers

References

External links

 Ersun Yanal at TFF.org
 Ersun Yanal at Mackolik.com
 Ersun Yanal at Fenerbahçe.org

1961 births
Living people
People from Buca
Manisa Celal Bayar University alumni
Turkish football managers
Denizlispor managers
MKE Ankaragücü managers
Gençlerbirliği S.K. managers
Turkey national football team managers
Manisaspor managers
Trabzonspor managers
Fenerbahçe football managers
Antalyaspor managers
Alanyaspor managers
Süper Lig managers